The 19th European Women's Artistic Gymnastics Championships was held in Nantes, France in 1992.

Medalists

Results

All-around

Vault

Uneven bars

Balance beam

Floor

References 

1992
International gymnastics competitions hosted by France
European Artistic Gymnastics Championships
1992 in French sport